Dominican Republic participated at the 2018 Summer Youth Olympics in Buenos Aires, Argentina from 6 October to 18 October 2018.

Archery

Dominican Republic qualified one archer based on its performance at the American Continental Qualification Tournament.

Individual

Team

Athletics

Badminton

Dominican Republic qualified one player based on the Badminton Junior World Rankings. 

Singles

Team

Futsal
Summary

Group D

Judo

Sailing

Dominican Republic qualified one boat based on its performance at the North American and Caribbean IKA Twin Tip Qualifiers. They later qualified a boat in the boys' event based on its performance at the 2018 IKA Twin Tip Racing Youth World Championship.

Swimming

Tennis

Singles

Doubles

Weightlifting

References

2018 in Dominican Republic sport
Nations at the 2018 Summer Youth Olympics
Dominican Republic at the Youth Olympics